Taxa K 1640 efterlyses is a 1956 Danish drama film directed by Lau Lauritzen Jr. and starring Poul Reichhardt.

Cast
 Lau Lauritzen Jr. as Jacob Svendsen
 Poul Reichhardt as Eigil Rasmussen
 Lisbeth Movin as Else Svendsen
 Fernanda Movin as Tante Astrid
 Paul Hagen as Spætten
 Karl Stegger as Kommoden (K-1640)
 Mogens Davidsen as Flagstangen
 Ole Monty as Sorteper
 Torkil Lauritzen as Taxa inspektør
 Birgitte Bruun as Frk. Hansen
 Kirsten Passer as Radiodame på Taxa
 Emil Hass Christensen as Overlægen
 Gunnar Lauring as Politikommissær Dyrbro
 Ebbe Langberg as Leif Rasmussen
 Bodil Steen as Taxakunde

External links

1956 films
1956 drama films
1950s Danish-language films
Danish black-and-white films
Films directed by Lau Lauritzen Jr.
Films scored by Sven Gyldmark
ASA Filmudlejning films
Danish drama films